The Massif du Sud is a ski mountain about  southeast of Quebec City, Canada.  It is part of the park of the same name, the Parc du Massif du Sud.

Description 

The Massif du Sud is located between the villages of Saint-Magloire and Saint-Philémon in Bellechasse, Québec, Canada.  

Often confounded with Le Massif, the Massif du Sud is renowned for its natural snow and its glades.

History

The Massif du Sud was first opened in 1989, but has since changed owner many times.     
 
, there is a wind power project in the area of the mountain, which is contested by the main shareholder, Alain Contant.
 
Building on its fame in backcountry glades, the resort has a snowcat-skiing operation in the backcountry region and will introduce heliskiing in the 2011 season. It is the only resort in eastern North America to have heliskiing.

Trivia 

The Massif du Sud slogan is "Le secret le mieux gardé" which translates as "The Best Kept Secret".
The Massif du Sud closest neighbor is Mont Orignal.

See also
 Le Massif de Charlevoix
 Mont-Sainte-Anne
 Stoneham
 List of ski areas and resorts in Canada

References

External links
 Parc du Massif du Sud - Québec

Ski areas and resorts in Quebec
Geography of Chaudière-Appalaches
Tourist attractions in Chaudière-Appalaches
Notre Dame Mountains
Mountains of Quebec under 1000 metres